James A. Bellamy (1925 – July 21, 2015) was Professor Emeritus of Arabic Literature at the University of Michigan.

Research
Bellamy has been an important scholar in the textual criticism of the Quran, even being described as the "doyen" of its emendation, and one of the few to practice emendation since Ignác Goldziher and Theodor Nöldeke.  In a series of articles from 1973 to 2002 in the Journal of the American Oriental Society, Bellamy proposed a number of conjectural emendations to the standard text of the Quran.  Bellamy described textual criticism as like an "addiction" to him. He gave a succinct description of his job as "the correction of errors in texts."

Bellamy's approach makes him a representative of the Revisionist School of Islamic Studies.

Select publications

Notes

References

External links
Page at the University of Michigan, Near Eastern Studies

Middle Eastern studies in the United States
History of Quran scholars
University of Michigan faculty